Greg Roberts (born 29 May 1956) is an English drummer. He was a member of Big Audio Dynamite from 1984 to 1990, a band led by Mick Jones, former lead guitarist, and co-lead vocalist of the Clash. He went on to form Screaming Target in 1991 with ex-Big Audio Dynamite members Don Letts and Leo "E-Zee Kill" Williams, then started Dreadzone with Tim Bran, Williams and Dan Donovan, another former Big Audio Dynamite member. Dreadzone had a No. 20 hit in the UK Singles Chart with "Little Britain" in 1996.

A self-taught musician, Roberts has said that his experience with Big Audio Dynamite – particularly the band's use of technology (including a drum machine) – enabled him to become a writer and arranger, and also led to him forming Dreadzone.

Roberts has also worked as a session musician, playing on Scott Merritt's fourth studio album, Violet and Black (1990).

Discography

With Big Audio Dynamite
This Is Big Audio Dynamite (1985)
No. 10, Upping St. (1986)
Tighten Up Vol. 88 (1988)
Megatop Phoenix (1989)

With Screaming Target
Hometown Hi-Fi (1991, Island Records)

With Dreadzone
 360° (1993, Tristar)
 Little Britain (1995, Virgin Records)
 Second Light (1995, Virgin Records)
 Zion Youth (1995, Virgin Records)
 Moving On (1997, Virgin Records)
 Biological Radio (1997, Virgin Records)
 The Radio 1 Sessions (2001, Strange Fruit)
 Sound (2002)
 Once Upon a Time (2005)
 Eye on the Horizon (2005)
 Dread Times (2017)

References

 The Rolling Stone Encyclopedia of Rock & Roll – 3rd Edition
 The Guinness Book of British Hit Singles and Albums – 19th Edition

External links
 Dreadzone – Official web site
 
 
 

1958 births
Living people
English rock drummers
English dance musicians
English hip hop musicians
British male drummers
Big Audio Dynamite members
Musicians from London